Lew Chuen Hong is a Singaporean former two-star rear-admiral who served as Chief of Navy between 2017 and 2020. 

He is currently serving as the chief executive officer of Infocomm Media Development Authority (IMDA), and the commissioner for Personal Data Protection Commission (PDPC).

References 

Living people
Place of birth missing (living people)
Chiefs of the Republic of Singapore Navy
1977 births
21st-century Singaporean people